Facies anterior or anterior surface may refer to:

 Anterior surface of pancreas (facies anterior corporis pancreatis)
 Anterior surface of the body of maxilla (facies anterior corporis maxillae)
 Anterior surface the heart (facies anterior cordis)